Rud Barak (also Romanized as Rūd Bārak and Rūd-e Bārak) is a village in Asgariyeh Rural District, in the Central District of Pishva County, Tehran Province, Iran. At the 2006 census, its population was 324, in 74 families.

References 

Populated places in Pishva County